Countess Maria von Kalckreuth (1857-1897)  was a German painter known for her portraits.

Biography
Kalckreuth was born in 1857 in Düsseldorf, Germany. Her brother Leopold Graf von Kalckreuth was also a painter. She was taught to paint by her father Stanislaus von Kalckreuth in Weimar. She continued her studies with Sándor Liezen-Mayer in Munich.  Kalckreuth exhibited her work at the Woman's Building at the 1893 World's Columbian Exposition in Chicago, Illinois where she won a medal.

Kalckreuth died in 1897 in Dachau.

References

1857 births
1897 deaths
German women painters
19th-century German women artists
19th-century German painters
Artists from Düsseldorf
German countesses
German portrait painters
Kalckreuth family